The surface gravity, g, of an astronomical object is the gravitational acceleration experienced at its surface at the equator, including the effects of rotation. The surface gravity may be thought of as the acceleration due to gravity experienced by a hypothetical test particle which is very close to the object's surface and which, in order not to disturb the system, has negligible mass. For objects where the surface is deep in the atmosphere and the radius not known, the surface gravity is given at the 1 bar pressure level in the atmosphere.

Surface gravity is measured in units of acceleration, which, in the SI system, are meters per second squared. It may also be expressed as a multiple of the Earth's standard surface gravity, which is equal to
g = 
In astrophysics, the surface gravity may be expressed as log g, which is obtained by first expressing the gravity in cgs units, where the unit of acceleration and surface gravity is centimeters per second squared (cm/s2), and then taking the base-10 logarithm of the cgs value of the surface gravity.

The surface gravity of a white dwarf is very high, and of a neutron star even higher. One measure of such immense gravity is that neutron stars have an escape velocity of around 100,000 km/s, about a third of the speed of light. For black holes, the surface gravity must be calculated relativistically.

Relationship of surface gravity to mass and radius

In the Newtonian theory of gravity, the gravitational force exerted by an object is proportional to its mass: an object with twice the mass produces twice as much force. Newtonian gravity also follows an inverse square law, so that moving an object twice as far away divides its gravitational force by four, and moving it ten times as far away divides it by 100. This is similar to the intensity of light, which also follows an inverse square law: with relation to distance, light becomes less visible. Generally speaking, this can be understood as geometric dilution corresponding to point-source radiation into three-dimensional space.

A large object, such as a planet or star, will usually be approximately round, approaching hydrostatic equilibrium (where all points on the surface have the same amount of gravitational potential energy). On a small scale, higher parts of the terrain are eroded, with eroded material deposited in lower parts of the terrain. On a large scale, the planet or star itself deforms until equilibrium is reached. For most celestial objects, the result is that the planet or star in question can be treated as a near-perfect sphere when the rotation rate is low. However, for young, massive stars, the equatorial azimuthal velocity can be quite high—up to 200 km/s or more—causing a significant amount of equatorial bulge. Examples of such rapidly rotating stars include Achernar, Altair, Regulus A and Vega.

The fact that many large celestial objects are approximately spheres makes it easier to calculate their surface gravity. According to the shell theorem, the gravitational force outside a spherically symmetric body is the same as if its entire mass were concentrated in the center, as was established by Sir Isaac Newton. Therefore, the surface gravity of a planet or star with a given mass will be approximately inversely proportional to the square of its radius, and the surface gravity of a planet or star with a given average density will be approximately proportional to its radius. For example, the recently discovered planet, Gliese 581 c, has at least 5 times the mass of Earth, but is unlikely to have 5 times its surface gravity. If its mass is no more than 5 times that of the Earth, as is expected, and if it is a rocky planet with a large iron core, it should have a radius approximately 50% larger than that of Earth. Gravity on such a planet's surface would be approximately 2.2 times as strong as on Earth. If it is an icy or watery planet, its radius might be as large as twice the Earth's, in which case its surface gravity might be no more than 1.25 times as strong as the Earth's.

These proportionalities may be expressed by the formula:

where g is the surface gravity of an object, expressed as a multiple of the Earth's, m is its mass, expressed as a multiple of the Earth's mass (5.976·1024 kg) and r its radius, expressed as a multiple of the Earth's (mean) radius (6,371 km). For instance, Mars has a mass of 6.4185·1023 kg = 0.107 Earth masses and a mean radius of 3,390 km = 0.532 Earth radii. The surface gravity of Mars is therefore approximately

times that of Earth. Without using the Earth as a reference body, the surface gravity may also be calculated directly from Newton's law of universal gravitation, which gives the formula

where M is the mass of the object, r is its radius, and G is the gravitational constant. If we let ρ = M/V denote the mean density of the object, we can also write this as

 

so that, for fixed mean density, the surface gravity g is proportional to the radius r.

Since gravity is inversely proportional to the square of the distance, a space station 400 km above the Earth feels almost the same gravitational force as we do on the Earth's surface. A space station does not plummet to the ground because it is in an orbit around the Earth.

Gas giants
For gas giant planets such as Jupiter, Saturn, Uranus, and Neptune, the surface gravity is given at the 1 bar pressure level in the atmosphere.

Non-spherically symmetric objects
Most real astronomical objects are not perfectly spherically symmetric. One reason for this is that they are often rotating, which means that they are affected by the combined effects of gravitational force and centrifugal force. This causes stars and planets to be oblate, which means that their surface gravity is smaller at the equator than at the poles. This effect was exploited by Hal Clement in his SF novel Mission of Gravity, dealing with a massive, fast-spinning planet where gravity was much higher at the poles than at the equator.

To the extent that an object's internal distribution of mass differs from a symmetric model, we may use the measured surface gravity to deduce things about the object's internal structure. This fact has been put to practical use since 1915–1916, when Roland Eötvös's torsion balance was used to prospect for oil near the city of Egbell (now Gbely, Slovakia.), p. 1663;, p. 223. In 1924, the torsion balance was used to locate the Nash Dome oil fields in Texas., p. 223.

It is sometimes useful to calculate the surface gravity of simple hypothetical objects which are not found in nature. The surface gravity of infinite planes, tubes, lines, hollow shells, cones, and even more unrealistic structures may be used to provide insights into the behavior of real structures.

Black holes
In relativity, the Newtonian concept of acceleration turns out not to be clear cut. For a black hole, which must be treated relativistically, one cannot define a surface gravity as the acceleration experienced by a test body at the object's surface because there is no surface. This is because the acceleration of a test body at the event horizon of a black hole turns out to be infinite in relativity. Because of this, a renormalized value is used that corresponds to the Newtonian value in the non-relativistic limit. The value used is generally the local proper acceleration (which diverges at the event horizon) multiplied by the gravitational time dilation factor (which goes to zero at the event horizon). For the Schwarzschild case, this value is mathematically well behaved for all non-zero values of r and M.

When one talks about the surface gravity of a black hole, one is defining a notion that behaves analogously to the Newtonian surface gravity, but is not the same thing. In fact, the surface gravity of a general black hole is not well defined. However, one can define the surface gravity for a black hole whose event horizon is a Killing horizon.

The surface gravity  of a static Killing horizon is the acceleration, as exerted at infinity, needed to keep an object at the horizon. Mathematically, if  is a suitably normalized Killing vector, then the surface gravity is defined by

where the equation is evaluated at the horizon. For the Schwarzschild solution, we take  to be the time translation Killing vector , and more generally for the Kerr–Newman solution we take , the linear combination of the time translation and axisymmetry Killing vectors which is null at the horizon, where  is the angular velocity.

Schwarzschild solution
Since  is a Killing vector  implies . In  coordinates . Performing a coordinate change to the advanced Eddington–Finklestein coordinates  causes the metric to take the form

 

Under a general change of coordinates the Killing vector transforms as  giving the vectors  and 

Considering the b =  entry for  gives the differential equation 

Kerr solution
The surface gravity for the uncharged, rotating black hole is, simply

Kerr–Newman solution
The surface gravity for the Kerr–Newman solution is

Dynamical black holes
Surface gravity for stationary black holes is well defined. This is because all stationary black holes have a horizon that is Killing. Recently there has been a shift towards defining the surface gravity of dynamical black holes whose spacetime does not admit a Killing vector (field). Several definitions have been proposed over the years by various authors. As of current, there is no consensus or agreement of which definition, if any, is correct.

References

External links
Newtonian surface gravity
Exploratorium – Your Weight on Other Worlds

Gravity
Black holes
General relativity